Fort Washington Plaza is located at the corner of West Fort Street and Washington Boulevard in downtown Detroit, Michigan. It occupies the entire block bordered by West Fort Street, Washington Boulevard, Cass Avenue, and West Congress Street. The high-rise office building stands 16 stories in height. It was built in 1969, and includes a parking garage. It was designed in the international architectural style. It uses mainly concrete and glass.

References

Further reading

External links
 Google Maps location of Fort Washington Plaza (333 West Fort Street)
 
 

Skyscraper office buildings in Detroit
1969 establishments in Michigan
Office buildings completed in 1969
International style architecture in Michigan